Winchester is a census-designated place (CDP) in Riverside County, California, USA. As of the 2010 census, the CDP had a total population of 2,534, up from 2,155 at the 2000 census.

Winchester was founded in 1886 in Peasant Valley in what was then San Diego County. The town was named after the widow of Horace Winchester, Mrs. Amy Winchester.

Largely rural for most of its history, and home to agricultural businesses including the Winchester Cheese Company, Winchester experienced rapid growth during the housing construction boom in the early-to-mid 2000s.  However, construction and growth slowed when the housing bubble burst in 2007, resulting in a housing market correction.  The mid-to-late 2010s saw housing prices in Winchester recover and construction continue with new subdivisions, schools, and parks being built.

Geography
Winchester is located at  (33.707871, -117.086861).

It is approximately 8 miles southwest of the city of Hemet, California.

Demographics

2010
At the 2010 census Winchester had a population of 2,534. The racial makeup of Winchester was 1,577 (62.2%) White, 38 (1.5%) African American, 17 (0.7%) Native American, 46 (1.8%) Asian, 2 (0.1%) Pacific Islander, 728 (28.7%) from other races, and 126 (5.0%) from two or more races. Hispanic or Latino of any race were 1,233 persons (48.7%). 

The whole population lived in households, no one lived in non-institutionalized group quarters and no one was institutionalized.

There were 769 households, 326 (42.4%) had children under the age of 18 living in them, 425 (55.3%) were opposite-sex married couples living together, 94 (12.2%) had a female householder with no husband present, 53 (6.9%) had a male householder with no wife present.  There were 54 (7.0%) unmarried opposite-sex partnerships, and 6 (0.8%) same-sex married couples or partnerships. 149 households (19.4%) were one person and 71 (9.2%) had someone living alone who was 65 or older. The average household size was 3.30.  There were 572 families (74.4% of households); the average family size was 3.78.

The age distribution was 762 people (30.1%) under the age of 18, 218 people (8.6%) aged 18 to 24, 613 people (24.2%) aged 25 to 44, 649 people (25.6%) aged 45 to 64, and 292 people (11.5%) who were 65 or older.  The median age was 34.6 years. For every 100 females, there were 102.6 males.  For every 100 females age 18 and over, there were 104.4 males.

There were 850 housing units at an average density of 109.9 per square mile, of the occupied units 491 (63.8%) were owner-occupied and 278 (36.2%) were rented. The homeowner vacancy rate was 4.3%; the rental vacancy rate was 5.4%.  1,514 people (59.7% of the population) lived in owner-occupied housing units and 1,020 people (40.3%) lived in rental housing units.

2000
At the 2000 census there were 2,155 people, 741 households, and 532 families in the CDP. The racial makeup of the CDP was 78.1% White, 2.0% African American, 1.5% Native American, 0.4% Asian, 0.3% Pacific Islander, 14.3% from other races, and 3.5% from two or more races. Hispanic or Latino of any race were 31.4%.

Of the 741 households 32.5% had children under the age of 18 living with them, 54.9% were married couples living together, 10.5% had a female householder with no husband present, and 28.2% were non-families. 22.0% of households were one person and 9.4% were one person aged 65 or older.  The average household size was 2.9 and the average family size was 3.4.

The age distribution was 28.2% under the age of 18, 8.4% from 18 to 24, 26.1% from 25 to 44, 22.5% from 45 to 64, and 14.8% 65 or older.  The median age was 37 years. For every 100 females, there were 99.9 males.  For every 100 females age 18 and over, there were 98.0 males.

The median household income was $33,472 and the median family income  was $39,167. Males had a median income of $26,354 versus $28,021 for females. The per capita income for the CDP was $15,028.  About 9.7% of families and 13.8% of the population were below the poverty line, including 9.8% of those under age 18 and 11.6% of those age 65 or over.

Suburbs surrounding Winchester 
 French Valley
 Murrieta
 Menifee
 Hemet
 Homeland

Notable residents 
 Sgt. Janek Pawel Pietrzak and his wife, Quiana Faye Jenkins-Pietrzak, 2008 murder victims.
 Adam Yahiye Gadahn, spokesman for al-Qaeda and adviser to Osama bin Laden, spent his childhood living on the family's farm in Winchester.

Politics
In the state legislature Winchester is located in the 28th Senate District, represented by Republican Melissa Melendez, and in the 67th Assembly District, represented by Republican Kelly Seyarto of Murrieta.

References

Census-designated places in Riverside County, California
Census-designated places in California